Xi Herculis is a solitary star located within the northern constellation of Hercules. The star is visible to the naked eye with an apparent visual magnitude of 3.70. Based upon an annual parallax shift of 23.84 mas as seen from Earth, it is located 137 light years from the Sun. At that distance, the visual magnitude of the star is diminished by an extinction factor of 0.05 due to interstellar dust. It is a suspected member of the Sirius stream of co-moving stars.

This is an evolved G-type giant star with a stellar classification of G8 III. It is a red clump star, which means it is on the horizontal branch and generating energy through the thermonuclear fusion of hydrogen at its core. It has twice the mass of the Sun but, at the age of two and a half billion years, it has expanded to 10 times the Sun's radius. The star is radiating 51 times the solar luminosity from its photosphere at an effective temperature of 4,966 K.

Xi Herculis is a semiregular variable star, oscillating in brightness by 3 hundredths of a magnitude, over a period of 120.8 days.

Chinese name

In R.H.Allen's book Star Names: Their Lore and Meaning, this star, together with ν Her and 99 Her (b Herculis) represent the state of Zhongshan (or Chung Shan' "the Middle Mountain"), but in Chinese literature, that names is applied to ο Her.

Markov 1, the mini teapot
One third of a degree to the north-northwest of Xi Herculis is the location of a telescopic asterism in the shape of a teapot. This teapot (Markov 1) could be seen as a somewhat twisted small equivalent of the large and easy to recognize teapot asterism in the constellation Sagittarius.

References

G-type giants
Horizontal-branch stars
Semiregular variable stars
Hercules (constellation)
Herculis, Xi
Herculis, 092
087933
163993
6703
Durchmusterung objects